Phalcon is a PHP web framework based on the model–view–controller (MVC) pattern.  Originally released in 2012, it is an open-source framework licensed under the terms of the BSD License.

Unlike most PHP frameworks, Phalcon is implemented as a web server extension written in Zephir and C, aiming to boost execution speed, reduce resource usage, and handle more HTTP requests per second than comparable frameworks written primarily in PHP.  One drawback of this approach is that root/administrative access is required on the server to install Phalcon by building a custom binary or using a precompiled one.

History 
Phalcon was created by Andrés Gutiérrez and collaborators looking for a new approach to traditional web application frameworks written in PHP. The original draft of the framework in 2011 was called "Spark", the name was later changed to Phalcon, representing the words "PHP" and "falcon".  Phalcon's initial release was made available on November 14, 2012.

Phalcon 0.3.5 includes an ORM written in C, MVC components, and cache components. This release was followed by the Phalcon 0.5.0 that brought a high-level dialect of SQL called PHQL, and Phalcon 0.6.0 that introduced Volt, a template engine similar to Jinja. Phalcon 1.0 was released on March 22, 2013. with Phalcon 1.3 being the last minor release in that series.  Phalcon 2.0 saw most of the project ported from C to Zephir.

v3 
Phalcon 3.0.0 was released on 29 July 2016, this major release includes support for PHP 7 as well as being Phalcon's first LTS (Long Term Support) release. Phalcon also adopted SemVer for their next releases versioning.

v4 
Phalcon 4.0.0 was released on 21 December 2019, this major release includes support for PHP 7.2, 7.3 and 7.4 has stricter Interfaces and support PSR-3, PSR-7, PSR-11 (proxy), PSR-13, PSR-16, PSR-17.

v5 
On 19 August 2020, it was announced that Serghei Iakovlev, one of the core contributors on the Zephir language was stepping down from the project. Antonio Braga and Kleber Faustino took over the maintenance of Zephir as well as the Zephir Parser, providing much needed support and fixes to long standing bugs. Nikolaos Dimopoulos took over the full maintenance of Phalcon.

The team decided to change direction, offering v5 as a PHP extension with support for PHP 7.4 and 8.0+. For v6, Phalcon will be offered as a pure PHP implementation and will support PHP versions 8.0+. However, there will also be an extension available, for those that need extra performance. The new extension will work in parallel with v6.

In v5, support for PSR interfaces has been removed. Repositories with proxy classes that implement PSR were made available for those that need these classes. Additionally, the Packagecloud repositories have been discontinued, leaving PECL the official installation source for Phalcon (other than building it from sources).

During a Phalcon Hangout on 6 September 2020, the team announced that work has started on Phalcon 5. With this announcement, the projects new repositories were officially made public.

Phalcon v5.0.0 was released during a live Hangout on September 23, 2022. A lot of members of the community joined and congratulated the team for releasing v5.0.0 stable. A day later a bug was discovered and the team released v5.0.1

Community Projects 
Phalcon Slayer is a wrapper that restructures the Phalcon framework.

See also 
 Zephir (programming language)

References 

PHP frameworks
Software using the BSD license